Nelly Uzonna Edith Uchendu, MON (1950  12 April 2005), was a Nigerian singer, composer and actress. Revered for modernizing traditional Igbo folk music, Uchendu rose to prominence upon the release of her 1976 song "Love Nwantinti" which earned her the "Lady with the Golden Voice" sobriquet. She released 6 LP recordings during her career.

Life and career

She was born in 1950 in Umuchu, a town in Aguata local government area of Anambra State, Eastern Nigeria. Uchendu started singing at an early age. She later joined Professor Sonny Oti's music group under which she flourished using her vocals. In 1976, her music career shot to limelight following the release of the Homzy Sounds-produced classic titled "Love Nwantiti" off her debut LP composition Love Nwantiti; before she went on to release "Waka", "Aka Bu Eze" and "Mama Hausa" which further established her in the Nigeria music industry. Her music career saw her record in several genres of music including Igbo highlife, pop and gospel music which she did in the later part of her career. Uchendu's career also saw her perform outside Nigeria, most notably performing in London, England alongside Sir Warrior and his Oriental Brothers during the 1980s.

Acting
In 1986, Uchendu guest-starred as Ikemefuna's mother in NTA Network's televised version of Things Fall Apart in which she sang "Ikemefuna's Song". She also played Tony's mother in the 1994 Nollywood movie Nneka the Pretty Serpent, another singing role.

Discography
Love Nwantiti (1976)
Aka Bu Eze (1977)
Mama Awusa (1978)
I Believe (1979)
Ogadili Gi Nma (1982)
Make a New Nigeria (1988)
Ezigbo Dim (1982)
Nye ya ekele(1995)
Nna cheta m(1995)

Recognition
In recognition of her contributions to music in Nigeria, Uchendu received the national honour of Member of the Order of the Niger by former Nigerian president Shehu Shagari in 1980.

Death
She died on 12 April 2005 in a hospital in Enugu State, Nigeria after a reported cancer-related illness. She was aged 55.

References

External links

1950 births
2005 deaths
Musicians from Anambra State
20th-century Nigerian women singers
Nigerian composers
Igbo singers
Deaths from cancer in Nigeria
Members of the Order of the Federal Republic
20th-century women composers
Nigerian film actresses
Nigerian television actresses
Igbo actresses
Actresses from Anambra State
Nigerian women singers
Deaths from cancer